The meridian 108° west of Greenwich is a line of longitude that extends from the North Pole across the Arctic Ocean, North America, the Pacific Ocean, the Southern Ocean, and Antarctica to the South Pole.

The 108th meridian west forms a great circle with the 72nd meridian east.

From Pole to Pole
Starting at the North Pole and heading south to the South Pole, the 108th meridian west passes through:

{| class="wikitable plainrowheaders"
! scope="col" width="130" | Co-ordinates
! scope="col" | Country, territory or sea
! scope="col" | Notes
|-
| style="background:#b0e0e6;" | 
! scope="row" style="background:#b0e0e6;" | Arctic Ocean
| style="background:#b0e0e6;" |
|-
| style="background:#b0e0e6;" | 
! scope="row" style="background:#b0e0e6;" | Byam Martin Channel
| style="background:#b0e0e6;" |
|-
| 
! scope="row" | 
| Nunavut — Melville Island
|-
| style="background:#b0e0e6;" | 
! scope="row" style="background:#b0e0e6;" | Parry Channel
| style="background:#b0e0e6;" | Viscount Melville Sound
|-
| 
! scope="row" | 
| Nunavut — Kilian Island
|-
| style="background:#b0e0e6;" | 
! scope="row" style="background:#b0e0e6;" | Parry Channel
| style="background:#b0e0e6;" | Viscount Melville Sound
|-
| 
! scope="row" | 
| Nunavut — Victoria Island
|-
| style="background:#b0e0e6;" | 
! scope="row" style="background:#b0e0e6;" | Hadley Bay
| style="background:#b0e0e6;" |
|-
| 
! scope="row" | 
| Nunavut — Victoria Island
|-
| style="background:#b0e0e6;" | 
! scope="row" style="background:#b0e0e6;" | Dease Strait
| style="background:#b0e0e6;" |
|-valign="top"
| 
! scope="row" | 
| Nunavut — the Kent Peninsula (mainland)
|-
| style="background:#b0e0e6;" | 
! scope="row" style="background:#b0e0e6;" | Melville Sound
| style="background:#b0e0e6;" |
|-valign="top"
| 
! scope="row" | 
|-valign="top"
| 
! scope="row" | 
| Montana Wyoming — from  Colorado — from  New Mexico — from 
|-valign="top"
| 
! scope="row" | 
| Chihuahua Sinaloa — from 
|-
| style="background:#b0e0e6;" | 
! scope="row" style="background:#b0e0e6;" | Pacific Ocean
| style="background:#b0e0e6;" |
|-
| style="background:#b0e0e6;" | 
! scope="row" style="background:#b0e0e6;" | Southern Ocean
| style="background:#b0e0e6;" |
|-
| 
! scope="row" | Antarctica
| Unclaimed territory
|-
|}

See also
107th meridian west
109th meridian west

w108 meridian west